Beheshti (also Romanized as Beheshtī; also known as Behesht-e Zahrā) is a village in Azimiyeh Rural District, in the Central District of Ray County, Tehran Province, Iran. At the 2006 census, its population was 8,569, in 2,262 families.  Behesht-e Zahra cemetery is located nearby.

References 

Populated places in Ray County, Iran